Senator Treadway may refer to:

Allen T. Treadway (1867–1947), Massachusetts State Senate
Richard Treadway (1913–2006), Massachusetts State Senate